The London Guards is an administrative formation within the British Army comprising the Army Reserve companies of the British Army's Grenadier, Coldstream, Scots and Irish Guards. On formation these companies drew their personnel from the London Regiment which existed from 1993 to 2022.

Under the Integrated Review published in March 2021 it was announced the London Regiment would lose its regimental status and re-designate as 1st Battalion London Guards. The former companies of the London Regiment became reserve companies of the four senior foot guard regiments with soldiers previously in the London Regiment transferred to foot guards regiments.  The London Guards is not a regiment, the companies wear the uniform, and follow the traditions, of their foot guards regiment.

History

The London Regiment was reformed in 1993 through the re-regimentation of some of the remaining successors of the original regiment (not including, for example, the Artists Rifles or Kensington Regiment (Princess Louise's)), which were part of a number of different TA infantry units:
8th (Volunteer) Battalion, Queen's Fusiliers (8QF)
1st Battalion, 51st Highland Volunteers (1/51 HIGHLAND)
4th (Volunteer) Battalion, Royal Irish Rangers (North Irish Militia) (4 R IRISH)

In 1992, the London Scottish, which formed G Company 1/51 HIGHLAND, and the London Irish Rifles, who were D Company 4 R IRISH, were both transferred to 8QF in preparation for its conversion in 1993 to the London Regiment. Upon the regiment's formation, one of the original companies of the former Queen's Regiment, A Company, was disbanded, leaving the new regiment's order of battle as:
RHQ and HQ (Anzio) Company at Battersea (this was the former RHQ location for 8QF; Anzio was chosen for HQ Company as a battle honour common to the antecedents of the four rifle companies)
A (The London Scottish) Company at Westminster and Catford
B (Queen's Regiment) Company at Edgware and Hornsey
C (City of London Fusiliers) Company at Balham and Camberwell
D (London Irish Rifles) Company at Chelsea (Duke of York's HQ)

Two companies of the Royal Green Jackets, F Company and G Company, formed part of the regiment between 1998 and 2004.

In 2004 elements of the London Regiment were deployed to Iraq.

Following the restructuring of the British Army in 2004, it was announced that the Guards Division would gain a Territorial Army battalion. This saw the London Regiment retaining its name and multi-badge structure, while transferring from the Queen's Division to the Guards Division. The two Royal Green Jackets companies were transferred to the Royal Rifle Volunteers in preparation for the formation of The Rifles in 2007.

In July 2017 B Company transferred to the Princess of Wales's Royal Regiment to become B Company, 4th Battalion The Princess of Wales's Royal Regiment; and C Company transferred to the Royal Regiment of Fusiliers to become C Company, 5th Battalion The Royal Regiment of Fusiliers. To replace these two sub-units, F Company, 7th Battalion The Rifles returned to the London Regiment, while a new G Company was raised.  In addition to the regimental re-structuring, the regiment was moved under command of the 11th Infantry Brigade and Headquarters South East and was to be known as the 'Guards reserve battalion'. In 2020 a FOI answer stated it also fell under HQ London District.

 Regimental Headquarters, Battersea
 HQ (London Irish Rifles) Company, Camberwell
 A (The London Scottish) Company, Westminster and Mortar Platoon, Catford
 F (Rifles) Company, Hammersmith
 G (Guards) Company, Kingston upon Thames

In 2021, under the Future Soldier part of the Integrated Review published on 16 March, it was announced that the London Regiment would be re-designated as 1st Battalion London Guards by February 2024.

Conversion to foot guards
In April 2022, the London Regiment was re-designated 1st Battalion London Guards and ceased to be a regiment in its own right, with its companies transitioning to become reserve companies of the four senior foot guards regiments. The companies do not form a regiment; reservists being members of a foot guards regiment. 

Deputy Honorary Colonels for the existing companies (representing on the London Regiment's Regimental Council the regimental identities that the companies derived from) are to continue in post to provide continuity for one year, thereafter, they will be replaced by senior representatives of the respective foot guard regiments. The administrative Headquarters is at St John's Hill with the reserve foot guards companies at:

Ypres Company, Grenadier Guards (formerly G (Guards) Company), Kingston upon Thames
No 17 Company, Coldstream Guards (formerly F (Rifles) Company), Hammersmith
G (Messines) Company, Scots Guards (formerly A (London Scottish) Company), in Victoria with detached mortar platoon at Bellingham
No 15 (Loos) Company, Irish Guards (formerly HQ (London Irish Rifles) Company), Camberwell with a detached rifle platoon at St John's Hill.

Order of precedence

Whilst it existed, the London Regiment fell after the Parachute Regiment in precedence.

References

External links 
 

Infantry regiments of the British Army
Military units and formations in London
County of London
Military units and formations established in 1993
1993 establishments in the United Kingdom